"Trouble" is a song written by Todd Snider and included on his 1994 debut album Songs for the Daily Planet.  The song was subsequently recorded by American country music artist Mark Chesnutt and released in September 1995 as the first single from his album Wings.  Chesnutt's version reached number 18 on the Billboard Hot Country Singles & Tracks chart.

Music video
The music video was directed by Sherman Halsey and premiered in September 1995.

Chart performance
"Trouble" debuted at number 57 on the U.S. Billboard Hot Country Singles & Tracks for the week of September 23, 1995.

References

1995 singles
1995 songs
Mark Chesnutt songs
Song recordings produced by Tony Brown (record producer)
Decca Records singles